Fresno Freeze Futbol Club is an amateur women’s soccer team based in Fresno, California.

History
Fresno Freeze FC is an American professional soccer team based in Fresno, California. The team was founded in 2014 and played its inaugural season in 2015. The team competes in Women’s Premier Soccer League (WPSL), the second tier of the US women's soccer league system.

Colors and crest 
Freeze colors are ice blue and black. The club's logo is based on a shield shaped like the head of a spade with the background being black. Across the top of this shield is the name of the team name in white outlined in blue, while below are two vertical blue lines. At base of the crest is a frozen soccer ball representing the team's name.

Stadium
The Fresno Freeze hosts its games at Keith Tice Park.

Year-by-year

References

External links
Freeze FC Webpage

Fresno Freeze
Women's soccer clubs in California
Sports in Fresno, California
2014 establishments in California
Association football clubs established in 2014